The Duess Test is a projective test for young children. It consists of ten short incomplete stories to which children must think of endings.  The test was developed in Switzerland by Louisa Düss. The test, which is also known as Duess fables, was first translated to English by Louise Despert in 1946. It was later revised by practitioners such as Reuben Fine, who expanded the stories to 20.

The reliability of the Duess Test has been questioned due to its artificiality and expert recommendations that it should be used only for children under 11 years old.

References

Projective tests

fi:Projektiivinen testi